Walter Frederick Metcalf (15 December 1910 – 1981) was an English professional footballer who played in the Football League for Brentford and Coventry City as a left back.

Club career

Early years 
A left back, Metcalf began his career with hometown Midland League club Scarborough in 1931. He made just six league appearances before earning a move to First Division club Sunderland in 1932. Metcalf failed to make a senior appearance for the Rokerites and departed in March 1934.

Brentford 
Metcalf transferred to Second Division club Brentford in March 1934 for a four-figure fee. With first Jack Astley and then new signings Arthur Bateman and George Poyser ahead of him in the full back pecking order, Metcalf had to wait until 29 September 1934 to make his professional debut, which came in a 2–1 defeat to Hull City. He spent much of his time in the reserve team, with which he won the 1934-35 London Challenge Cup. Metcalf made just six further first team appearances for the Bees before departing Griffin Park in 1937.

Coventry City 
Metcalf joined Second Division club Coventry City in 1937 and made 78 appearances during the 1937–38 and 1938–39 seasons before professional football was suspended due to the outbreak of the Second World War in September 1939. Metcalf remained with Coventry during the war and made 130 appearances, in addition to playing as a guest for Nottingham Forest and Northampton Town. After hostilities ceased in 1945, Metcalf made two FA Cup appearances during the 1945–46 season and retired at the end of the campaign.

Personal life 
After retiring from football, Metcalf worked as a prison officer in Malaysia for 15 years. He later returned to his native Scarborough.

Career statistics

Honours 
Brentford Reserves
 London Challenge Cup: 1934–35

References

1910 births
1981 deaths
Sportspeople from Scarborough, North Yorkshire
English footballers
Association football fullbacks
Scarborough F.C. players
Sunderland A.F.C. players
Brentford F.C. players
Coventry City F.C. players
Nottingham Forest F.C. wartime guest players
English Football League players
Northampton Town F.C. wartime guest players
English expatriates in Malaysia